Irmak Yıldırım (born 2005) is a Turkish motocross raceser. She is her country's first female athlete in this sport. She is a ntive of Balıkesir, Turkey.

Encouraged by her father, she started motorcycle riding in 2012. She has been  participating in international motocross competitions since 2019. Supported by the Afyonkarahisar Municipality, she competed in the third leg of the 2021 FIM Women's Motocross World Championship held in Afyonkarahisar, Turkey. She placed 25th at the MXGP of Turkey and 23rd at the MXGP of Afyon rounds. She rides on a Gas Gas.

References

2005 births
Living people
Sportspeople from Balıkesir
Turkish motocross riders
Female motorcycle racers
Turkish sportswomen